Protomonaxonida is an extinct order of sea sponges. It is a paraphyletic group gathering the most ancient species from the Burgess Shale to modern sponges.

Families and genera
 Family †Choiidae Laubenfels, 1925
 Genus †Allantospongia Rigby & Hou, 1995
 Genus †Choia Walcott, 1920
 Genus †Choiaella Rigby & Hou, 1995
 Genus †Lenica Goryanskiy, 1977
 Family †Halichondritidae Rigby, 1986
 Genus †Halichondrites Walcott, 1920
 Genus †Pohlispongia Rigby & von Bitter, 2005
 Family †Hamptoniidae De Laubenfels, 1955
 Genus †Hamptonia Walcott, 1920
 Genus †Hamptoniella Rigby & Collins, 2004
 Family †Hazeliidae De Laubenfels, 1955
 Genus †Crumillospongia Rigby, 1986
 Genus †Falospongia Rigby, 1986
 Genus †Hazelia Walcott, 1920
 Family †Leptomitidae De Laubenfels, 1955
 Genus †Leptomitus Walcott, 1886
 Genus †Paraleptomitella Chen et al., 1989
 Genus †Wareiella Rigby & Harris, 1979
 Genus †Lobatospongia Rigby et al., 2007
 Family †Piraniidae De Laubenfels, 1955
 Genus †Moleculospina Rigby, 1986
 Genus †Pirania Walcott, 1920
 Family †Takakkawiidae De Laubenfels, 1955
 Genus †Takakkawia Walcott, 1920
 Family †Ulospongiellidae Rigby & Collins, 2004
 Genus †Hapalospongia Rigby & Collins, 2004
 Genus †Ulospongiella Rigby & Collins, 2004
 Family †Wapkiidae De Laubenfels, 1955
 Genus †Wapkia Walcott, 1920

The following families from the order Hadromerida are also sometimes placed in Protomonaxonida:
 Family Sollasellidae von Lendenfeld, 1887
 Genus †Luterospongia Rigby et al., 2008
 Genus †Mckittrickella Rigby et al., 2007
 Genus †Monaxoradiata Rigby & Bell, 2006
 Genus †Opetionella Zittel, 1878
 Genus †Rhizopsis Schrammen, 1910
 Genus †Stramentella Gerasimov, 1960
 Genus †Trichospongiella Rigby, 1971
 Family Tethyidae Gray, 1867
 Genus Tethya Lamarck, 1814

References

External links 
 
 Protomonaxonida at fossilworks

 
Sponge orders